James Heartfield (born 1961) is a British historian and a lecturer.

Life
Born in Leeds, Heartfield has written a number of books on the history of the British Empire, including The British and Foreign Anti-Slavery Society (2016) and The Blood-Stained Poppy: A critique of the politics of commemoration (2019). His Ph.D. thesis (awarded by the University of Westminster) was published as The European Union and the End of Politics, in 2013. Heartfield has written for ArtReview,  Blueprint, Spiked Online, and the Times Education Supplement. 
In May 2006, with Julia Svetlichnaja, he interviewed the Russian dissident Alexander Litvinenko. In the Coronavirus pandemic of 2020, Heartfield worked as a vaccinator at Guy's and St Thomas's Hospital.

Politics
He has been critical of government policies on the creative industries, talking and writing on the illusions of the knowledge economy, and was active in the 'Design Agenda' group, campaigning for a realistic assessment of the Creative Industries, speaking at their 1998 conference on 'rebranding Britain' in 1998. Nick Bell named Heartfield as "one of the most important commentators on design".  Heartfield was a member of the Revolutionary Communist Party in the 1980s. In 2002 he helped set up the Audacity campaign for more house-building.
Heartfield stood as a candidate for the Brexit Party in the 2019 European Parliament election in the United Kingdom for Yorkshire and the Humber but did not gain a seat.

Personal life

He lives in north London and is married with two daughters.

Publications 
 Britain's Empires: A History, 1600-2020 London, Anthem Press, 2022
 The Blood-Stained Poppy: A critique of the politics of commemoration London, Zer0 Books, 2019
 The Equal Opportunities Revolution London, Repeater Books, 2017
 The British and Foreign Anti-Slavery Society London Hurst Books/Oxford University Press, 2016
 Who's Afraid of the Easter Rising? (with Kevin Rooney), London Zer0, Books, 2015
 The European Union and the End of Politics London, Zer0 Books, 2013
 British Workers & the US Civil War London, Reverspective, 2013
 Unpatriotic History of the Second World War London, Zer0 Books, 2012
 The Aborigines' Protection Society: Humanitarian Imperialism in Australia, New Zealand, Fiji, Canada, South Africa, and the Congo, 1836-1909 Hurst (London), and Columbia University Press (New York), 2011
 Green Capitalism: manufacturing scarcity in an age of abundance, Openmute, 2008
 Let's Build! Why we need Five Million Homes in the next 10 Years (Audacity, 2006)
 Escape the Creative Ghetto, with Chris Powell, NESTA, 2006
 Creativity Gap Blueprint, 2005
 The "Death of the Subject" Explained Sheffield Hallam University Press, 2002
 Great Expectations: the creative industries in the New Economy London, Design Agenda, 2000
 Need and Desire in the Post-material Economy Sheffield Hallam University Press, 1998
 Sustaining Architecture in the Anti-Machine Ageco-editor with Ian Abley, London, John Wiley, 2002.

References

External links 
James Heartfield's home page
Telegraph article on Litvinenko

1961 births
British male journalists
Living people
British Empire
Historians of colonialism
Revolutionary Communist Party (UK, 1978) members
Reform UK politicians
Date of birth missing (living people)